The skinks are a family of lizards.

Skink may also refer to:
 Skink anti-aircraft tank, a Canadian World War II  armoured vehicle developed but not put into service
 , a United States Navy patrol vessel in commission from 1917 to 1918
 Pseudoym of Clinton Tyree, a recurring character in novels by Carl Hiaasen
 The Skinks, a unit from the Warhammer Lizardmen army
 Cullen skink, a thick Scottish soup
 Skink (record label), a vanity label of Spinnin' Records